Silje is a Norwegian given female name. It is a short form of the Latin female name Caecilia / Cecilie from the family name Caecilius which is formed from the Latin adjective Caecus, "blind". Notable people with the name include:

 Silje Bolset, Norwegian handball player
 Silje Ekroll Jahren (born 1988), Norwegian orienteering competitor and junior world champion
 Silje Jørgensen (born 1975), former Norwegian footballer and Olympic champion
 Silje Lundberg (born 1988), Norwegian environmentalist and leader of Nature and Youth
 Silje Nergaard (born 1966), Norwegian jazz vocalist and songwriter
 Silje Nes (born 1980), Norwegian multi-instrumentalist and singer-songwriter
 Silje Norendal (born 1993), Norwegian snowboarder
 Silje Redergård (1989-1994), Norwegian murder victim
 Silje Reinåmo (born 1982), Norwegian actress, dancer and musical performer
 Silje Solberg (born 1990), Norwegian handball goalkeeper
 Silje Schei Tveitdal (born 1974), Norwegian environmentalist and politician for the Socialist Left Party
 Silje Vesterbekkmo (born 1983), Norwegian footballer
 Silje Vige (born 1976), Norwegian singer
 Silje Wergeland (born 1974), Norwegian singer-songwriter.

Norwegian feminine given names